Žakarovce is a village and municipality in the Gelnica District in the Košice Region of eastern Slovakia. In 2011 the village had 723 inhabitants.

References

External links
Official page of Žakarovce
http://en.e-obce.sk/obec/zakarovce/zakarovce.html

Villages and municipalities in Gelnica District